The carrot (Daucus carota subsp. sativus) is a root vegetable, typically orange in color, though purple, black, red, white, and yellow cultivars exist, all of which are domesticated forms of the wild carrot, Daucus carota, native to Europe and Southwestern Asia. The plant probably originated in Persia and was originally cultivated for its leaves and seeds. The most commonly eaten part of the plant is the taproot, although the stems and leaves are also eaten. The domestic carrot has been selectively bred for its enlarged, more palatable, less woody-textured taproot.

The carrot is a biennial plant in the umbellifer family, Apiaceae. At first, it grows a rosette of leaves while building up the enlarged taproot. Fast-growing cultivars mature within three months (90 days) of sowing the seed, while slower-maturing cultivars need a month longer (120 days). The roots contain high quantities of alpha- and beta-carotene, and are a good source of vitamin A, vitamin K, and vitamin B6.

The United Nations Food and Agriculture Organization (FAO) reports that world production of carrots and turnips (these plants are combined by the FAO) for 2018 was 40 million tonnes, with 45% of the world total grown in China. Carrots are commonly consumed raw or cooked in various cuisines.

Etymology

The word is first recorded in English circa 1530 and was borrowed from the Middle French , itself from the Late Latin , from the ancient Greek  ), originally from the Proto-Indo-European root  ('horn'), due to its horn-like shape. German  or Russian ).

Various languages still use the same word for carrot as they do for root; e.g. the Dutch .

History
Both written history and molecular genetic studies indicate that the domestic carrot has a single origin in Central Asia. Its wild ancestors probably originated in Persia (regions of which are now Iran and Afghanistan), which remains the centre of diversity for the wild carrot Daucus carota. A naturally occurring subspecies of the wild carrot was presumably bred selectively over the centuries to reduce bitterness, increase sweetness and minimise the woody core; this process produced the familiar garden vegetable.

When they were first cultivated, carrots were grown for their aromatic leaves and seeds rather than their roots. Carrot seeds have been found in Switzerland and Southern Germany dating back to 2000–3000 BC. Some close relatives of the carrot are still grown for their leaves and seeds, such as parsley, cilantro, coriander, fennel, anise, dill and cumin. The first mention of the root in classical sources is from the 1st century AD; the Romans ate a root vegetable called pastinaca, which may have been either the carrot or the closely related parsnip.

The plant is depicted and described in the Eastern Roman Juliana Anicia Codex, a 6th-century AD Constantinopolitan copy of the Greek physician Dioscorides' 1st-century pharmacopoeia of herbs and medicines, . Three different types of carrots are depicted, and the text states that "the root can be cooked and eaten". Another copy of this work, Codex Neapolitanes from late 6th or early 7th century, has basically the same illustrations but with roots in purple.

The plant was introduced into Spain by the Moors in the 8th century. In the 10th century, roots from West Asia, India and Europe were purple. The modern carrot originated in Afghanistan at about this time. The 11th-century Jewish scholar Simeon Seth describes both red and yellow carrots, as does the 12th-century Arab-Andalusian agriculturist, Ibn al-'Awwam. Cultivated carrots appeared in China in the 12th century, and in Japan in the 16th or 17th century.

There are many claims that Dutch growers created orange carrots in the 17th century to honor the Dutch flag at the time and William of Orange. Other authorities argue these claims lack convincing evidence. Modern carrots were described at about this time by the English antiquary John Aubrey (1626–1697): "Carrots were first sown at Beckington in Somersetshire. Some very old Man there [in 1668] did remember their first bringing hither." European settlers introduced the carrot to colonial America in the 17th century.

Outwardly purple carrots, still orange on the inside, were sold in British stores beginning in 2002.

Description

Daucus carota is a biennial plant. In the first year, its rosette of leaves produces large amounts of sugars, which are stored in the taproot to provide energy for the plant to flower in the second year.

Soon after germination, carrot seedlings show a distinct demarcation between taproot and stem: the stem is thicker and lacks lateral roots. At the upper end of the stem is the seed leaf. The first true leaf appears about 10–15 days after germination. Subsequent leaves are alternate (with a single leaf attached to a node), spirally arranged, and pinnately compound, with leaf bases sheathing the stem. As the plant grows, the bases of the seed leaves, near the taproot, are pushed apart. The stem, located just above the ground, is compressed and the internodes are not distinct.

Most of the taproot consists of a pulpy outer cortex (phloem) and an inner core (xylem). High-quality carrots have a large proportion of cortex compared to core. Although a completely xylem-free carrot is not possible, some cultivars have small and deeply pigmented cores; the taproot can appear to lack a core when the colour of the cortex and core are similar in intensity. Taproots are typically long and conical, although cylindrical and nearly-spherical cultivars are available.

Flower development begins when the flat meristem changes from producing leaves to an uplifted, conical meristem capable of producing stem elongation and a cluster of flowers. The cluster is a compound umbel, and each umbel contains several smaller umbels (umbellets). The first (primary) umbel occurs at the end of the main floral stem; smaller secondary umbels grow from the main branch, and these further branch into third, fourth, and even later-flowering umbels.

A large, primary umbel can contain up to 50 umbellets, each of which may have as many as 50 flowers; subsequent umbels have fewer flowers. Individual flowers are small and white, sometimes with a light green or yellow tint. They consist of five petals, five stamens, and an entire calyx. The stamens usually split and fall off before the stigma becomes receptive to receive pollen. The stamens of the brown, male, sterile flowers degenerate and shrivel before the flower fully opens. In the other type of male sterile flower, the stamens are replaced by petals, and these petals do not fall off. A nectar-containing disc is present on the upper surface of the carpels.

Flowers change sex in their development, so the stamens release their pollen before the stigma of the same flower is receptive. The arrangement is centripetal, meaning the oldest flowers are near the edge and the youngest flowers are in the center. Flowers usually first open at the outer edge of the primary umbel, followed about a week later on the secondary umbels, and then in subsequent weeks in higher-order umbels.

The usual flowering period of individual umbels is 7 to 10 days, so a plant can be in the process of flowering for 30–50 days. The distinctive umbels and floral nectaries attract pollinating insects. After fertilization and as seeds develop, the outer umbellets of an umbel bend inward causing the umbel shape to change from slightly convex or fairly flat to concave, and when cupped it resembles a bird's nest.

The fruit that develops is a schizocarp consisting of two mericarps; each mericarp is a true seed. The paired mericarps are easily separated when they are dry. Premature separation (shattering) before harvest is undesirable because it can result in seed loss. Mature seeds are flattened on the commissural side that faced the septum of the ovary. The flattened side has five longitudinal ribs. The bristly hairs that protrude from some ribs are usually removed by abrasion during milling and cleaning. Seeds also contain oil ducts and canals. Seeds vary somewhat in size, ranging from less than 500 to more than 1000 seeds per gram.

The carrot is a diploid species, and has nine relatively short, uniform-length chromosomes (2n=18). The genome size is estimated to be 473 mega base pairs, which is four times larger than Arabidopsis thaliana, one-fifth the size of the maize genome, and about the same size as the rice genome.

Chemistry

Polyacetylenes can be found in Apiaceae vegetables like carrots where they show cytotoxic activities. Falcarinol and falcarindiol (cis-heptadeca-1,9-diene-4,6-diyne-3,8-diol) are such compounds. This latter compound shows antifungal activity towards Mycocentrospora acerina and Cladosporium cladosporioides. Falcarindiol is the main compound responsible for bitterness in carrots.

Other compounds such as pyrrolidine (present in the leaves), 6-hydroxymellein, 6-methoxymellein, eugenin, 2,4,5-trimethoxybenzaldehyde (gazarin) or (Z)-3-acetoxy-heptadeca-1,9-diene-4,6-diin-8-ol (falcarindiol 3-acetate) can also be found in carrot.

Cultivation

Carrots are grown from seed and can take up to four months (120 days) to mature, but most cultivars mature within 70 to 80 days under the right conditions. They grow best in full sun but tolerate some shade. The ideal soil is deep, loose and well-drained, sandy or loamy, with a pH of 6.3 to 6.8.

Fertilizer should be applied according to soil type because the crop requires low levels of nitrogen, moderate phosphate and high potash. Rich or rocky soils should be avoided, as these will cause the roots to become hairy and/or misshapen. Irrigation is applied when needed to keep the soil moist.

Cultivation problems

There are several diseases that can reduce the yield and market value of carrots. The most devastating carrot disease is Alternaria leaf blight, which has been known to eradicate entire crops. A bacterial leaf blight caused by Xanthomonas campestris can also be destructive in warm, humid areas. Root knot nematodes (Meloidogyne species) can cause stubby or forked roots, or galls. Cavity spot, caused by the oomycetes Pythium violae and Pythium sulcatum, results in irregularly shaped, depressed lesions on the taproots.

Physical damage can also reduce the value of carrot crops. The two main forms of damage are splitting, whereby a longitudinal crack develops during growth that can be a few centimetres to the entire length of the root, and breaking, which occurs postharvest. These disorders can affect over 30% of commercial crops. Factors associated with high levels of splitting include wide plant spacing, early sowing, lengthy growth durations, and genotype.

Companion planting
Carrots benefit from strongly scented companion plants. The pungent odour of onions, leeks and chives help repel the carrot root fly, and other vegetables that team well with carrots include lettuce, tomatoes and radishes, as well as the herbs rosemary and sage. Carrots thrive in the presence of caraway, coriander, chamomile, marigold and Swan River daisy. They can also be good companions for other plants; if left to flower, the carrot, like any umbellifer, attracts predatory wasps that kill many garden pests.

Cultivars

Carrot cultivars can be grouped into two broad classes: "Eastern" carrots and "Western" carrots. A number of novelty cultivars have been bred for particular characteristics.

"Eastern" (a European and American continent reference) carrots were domesticated in Persia (probably in the lands of modern-day Iran and Afghanistan within West Asia) during the 10th century, or possibly earlier. Specimens of the Eastern carrot that survive to the present day are commonly purple or yellow, and often have branched roots. The purple colour common in these carrots comes from anthocyanin pigments.

The "Western" carrot emerged in the Netherlands in the 17th century. There is a popular belief that its orange colour made it popular in those countries as an emblem of the House of Orange and the struggle for Dutch independence, although there is little evidence for this. The orange colour results from abundant carotenes in these cultivars.

Western carrot cultivars are commonly classified by their root shape. The four general types are:
 Chantenay carrots. Although the roots are shorter than other cultivars, they have vigorous foliage and greater girth, being broad in the shoulders and tapering towards a blunt, rounded tip. They store well, have a pale-coloured core and are mostly used for processing. Cultivars include 'Carson Hybrid' and 'Red Cored Chantenay'.
 Danvers carrots. These have strong foliage and the roots are longer than Chantenay types, and they have a conical shape with a well-defined shoulder, tapering to a point. They are somewhat shorter than Imperator cultivars, but more tolerant of heavy soil conditions. Danvers cultivars store well and are used both fresh and for processing. They were developed in 1871 in Danvers, Massachusetts. Cultivars include 'Danvers Half Long' and 'Danvers 126'.
 Imperator carrots. This cultivar has vigorous foliage, is of high sugar content, and has long and slender roots, tapering to a pointed tip. Imperator types are the most widely cultivated by commercial growers. Cultivars include 'Imperator 58' and 'Sugarsnax Hybrid'.
 Nantes carrots. These have sparse foliage, are cylindrical, short with a more blunt tip than Imperator types, and attain high yields in a range of conditions. The skin is easily damaged and the core is deeply pigmented. They are brittle, high in sugar and store less well than other types. Cultivars include 'Nelson Hybrid', 'Scarlet Nantes' and 'Sweetness Hybrid'.

Carrot breeding programs have developed new cultivars to have dense amounts of chemically-stable acylated pigments, such as anthocyanins, which enrich carrot color based on the density and types of anthocyanin to produce different carrot colors. One particular cultivar lacks the usual orange pigment due to carotene, owing its white colour to a recessive gene for tocopherol (vitamin E), but this cultivar and wild carrots do not provide nutritionally significant amounts of vitamin E.

Production

In 2020, world production of carrots (combined with turnips) was 41 million tonnes, with China producing 44% of the world total (table). Other major producers were Uzbekistan and the United States.

Storage
Carrots can be stored for several months in the refrigerator or over winter in a moist, cool place. For long term storage, unwashed carrots can be placed in a bucket between layers of sand, a 50/50 mix of sand and wood shavings, or in soil. During storage, carrots may be subject to the development of bitterness, white blush, and browning, leading to carrot losses. Bitterness can be prevented by storage in well-ventilated rooms with low ethylene content (for example, without ethylene-producing fruit and vegetables). White blush and browning can be countered with application of edible films, heat treatment, application of hydrogen sulfide, and ultraviolet irradiation.

Consumption

Carrots can be eaten in a variety of ways. Only 3 percent of the β-carotene in raw carrots is released during digestion: this can be improved to 39% by pulping, cooking and adding cooking oil. Alternatively they may be chopped and boiled, fried or steamed, and cooked in soups and stews, as well as baby and pet foods. A well-known dish is carrots julienne. Together with onion and celery, carrots are one of the primary vegetables used in a mirepoix to make various broths.

The greens are edible as a leaf vegetable, but are rarely eaten by humans; some sources suggest that the greens contain toxic alkaloids. When used for this purpose, they are harvested young in high-density plantings, before significant root development, and typically used stir-fried, or in salads. Some people are allergic to carrots. In a 2010 study on the prevalence of food allergies in Europe, 3.6 percent of young adults showed some degree of sensitivity to carrots. Because the major carrot allergen, the protein Dauc c 1.0104, is cross-reactive with homologues in birch pollen (Bet v 1) and mugwort pollen (Art v 1), most carrot allergy sufferers are also allergic to pollen from these plants.

In India carrots are used in a variety of ways, as salads or as vegetables added to spicy rice or dal dishes. A popular variation in north India is the Gajar Ka Halwa carrot dessert, which has carrots grated and cooked in milk until the whole mixture is solid, after which nuts and butter are added. Carrot salads are usually made with grated carrots with a seasoning of mustard seeds and green chillies popped in hot oil. Carrots can also be cut in thin strips and added to rice, can form part of a dish of mixed roast vegetables or can be blended with tamarind to make chutney.

Since the late 1980s, baby carrots or mini-carrots (carrots that have been peeled and cut into uniform cylinders) have been a popular ready-to-eat snack food available in many supermarkets. Carrots are puréed and used as baby food, dehydrated to make chips, flakes, and powder, and thinly sliced and deep-fried, like potato chips.

The sweetness of carrots allows the vegetable to be used in some fruit-like roles. Grated carrots are used in carrot cakes, as well as carrot puddings, an English dish thought to have originated in the early 19th century. Carrots can also be used alone or blended with fruits in jams and preserves. Carrot juice is also widely marketed, especially as a health drink, either stand-alone or blended with juices extracted from fruits and other vegetables.

Highly excessive consumption over a period of time can result in carotenemia, a yellow-orange discoloration of the skin caused by a build up of carotenoids.

Nutrition

Raw carrots are 88% water, 9% carbohydrates, 0.9% protein, 2.8% dietary fiber, 1% ash and 0.2% fat. Carrot dietary fiber comprises mostly cellulose, with smaller proportions of hemicellulose, lignin and starch. Free sugars in carrot include sucrose, glucose, and fructose.

The carrot gets its characteristic, bright orange colour from β-carotene, and lesser amounts of α-carotene, γ-carotene, lutein, and zeaxanthin. α- and β-carotenes are partly metabolized into vitamin A, providing more than 100% of the Daily Value (DV) per 100 g serving of carrots (right table). Carrots are also a good source of vitamin K (13% DV) and vitamin B6 (11% DV), but otherwise have modest content of other essential nutrients (table).

Night vision
The provitamin A β-carotene from carrots does not actually help people to see in the dark unless they suffer from vitamin A deficiency. This myth was propaganda used by the Royal Air Force during the Second World War to explain why British pilots had improved night vision which enabled their success during nighttime air battles. 

Nevertheless, the consumption of carrots was advocated in Britain at the time as part of a Dig for Victory campaign. A radio programme called The Kitchen Front encouraged people to grow, store and use carrots in various novel ways, including making carrot jam and Woolton pie, named after the Lord Woolton, the Minister for Food. The British public during WWII generally believed that eating carrots would help them see better at night and in 1942 there was a 100,000-ton surplus of carrots from the extra production.

See also
 
 
 
 
 Turnip

References

Citations

Cited literature

External links

 
 
 

 
Daucus
Edible Apiaceae
Root vegetables
Apioideae
Plant subspecies
Endemic flora of Iran
Crops originating from Asia